The Women's National Football Conference (WNFC) is an amateur full-contact Women's American football league in the United States. With teams across the United States, the WNFC had its first game in 2019 with fourteen regular teams and one exhibition team.

League history

The Women's National Football Conference was founded in 2018, with their inaugural season in 2019.  On their website, the WNFC describes themselves as looking to create a standard of excellence and opportunities.  The WNFC does not charge teams of players a fee for entry into the league; rather, teams are invited into the league based on quality of market, team, players and ownership.

On December 10, 2018, the WNFC announced a partnership with Adidas, as part of the latter's "She Breaks Barriers" initiative.  As part of that partnership, Adidas serves as the WNFC's presenting sponsor, with all WNFC teams wearing custom-made Adidas uniforms.

2019
The WNFC played their inaugural season in 2019 with fourteen regular teams and one exhibition team.  Five teams came to the WNFC from the Independent Women's Football League (which folded after the 2018 season), three from the WFA, two from the USWFL and five were brand-new teams playing their inaugural season in the WNFC.

The season began on April 6 and ended with the inaugural IX Cup (named in honor of Title IX) on June 29, which saw the Texas Elite Spartans defeat the Utah Falconz 19-14.

2020
The WNFC added seven teams for the 2020 season; three from the WFA, two from the USWFL and three expansion teams. No games were played due to Covid-19.

2021
The WNFC returned to play on May 1, 2021. The league provided weekly Covid-19 testing for all its 20 teams. All games were streamed on the Vyre Network. The season ended with Texas Elite Spartans defeating the San Diego Rebellion 27-6.

2022
The WNFC played Week 1 of its 2022 season on April 2. All games were streamed on the Vyre Network. The season ended with the Texas Elite Spartans defeating the Utah Falconz 48-12. The WNFC website reports that their broadcast viewership across all Vyre Network platforms has skyrocketed by 475% from 2021, throughout the course of the 2022 season.

Teams

Map of teams

Former teams
New Orleans Hippies — Played in the WNFC in 2019
North Florida Pumas — Played in the WNFC in 2019, now a member of the Women's Tackle Football League.
San Diego Surge — Played in the WNFC in 2019
Nebraska Nite Hawks — Played in the WNFC in 2019-2021
Carolina Queens — Played in the WNFC in 2021
Los Angeles Bobcats — Played in the WNFC in 2019-2021

Timeline

IX Cup

References

External links
 Official website

Sports leagues established in 2018
Women's American football leagues
2018 establishments in the United States